Christopher David Castellani (born 1972) is the author of four novels and artistic director of the creative writing non-profit GrubStreet.

Family and education 
Christopher Castellani, the son of Italian immigrants, was born and raised in Wilmington, Delaware, and graduated from Salesianum School in 1990. He holds a B.A. in English literature from Swarthmore College, an M.A. in English literature from Tufts University, and an M.F.A. in creative writing from Boston University. He resides in Boston, Massachusetts. He has been married to Michael Borum since May 21, 2004.

Novels and other publications 
Castellani is the author of four novels.  His first book, A Kiss from Maddalena, won the 2004 Massachusetts Book Award. That novel and his next two, The Saint of Lost Things and All This Talk of Love, are devoted to the same Italian-American family and constitute, in one reviewer's phrase, "something of an opera buffa of the immigrant experience". He is also the author of The Art of Perspective: Who Tells the Story, an installment in the writing craft series from Graywolf Press. His short fiction and essays have been included in several anthologies.

Castellani's most recent book, Leading Men, is a fictionalized version of the relationship between Tennessee Williams and Frank Merlo. Writing in The New York Times, David Leavitt called it "intricately designed as a Lego kit" and said: "Engineering may be the aspect of novel writing that deserves the most praise and gets the least, and Castellani is a first-rate engineer. At its best, his novel not only exults in the historical synchronicities and proximities he has discovered but catches the reader up in its rapture." The novel is divided into two narratives and includes the full text of an invented, and intentionally bad, Tennessee Williams play. Leading Men is currently begin adapted into a feature film by playwright Matthew Lopez.

Academic and professional career 
Castellani taught English literature at Tufts University (1997–2000) and creative writing as a visiting professor at Swarthmore College (2007). In 2004 and 2005, Castellani was a Fellow at the Bread Loaf Writers' Conference at Middlebury College, and has served on the Bread Loaf faculty as well as the faculty of the Fine Arts Work Center in Provincetown, MA.  He is the artistic director of the creative writing non-profit GrubStreet, and serves on the faculty of the Warren Wilson College MFA Program for Writers.

As a result of the lawsuits between writers Sonya Larson and Dawn Dorland described in a 2021 New York Times article Who Is the Bad Art Friend, some of Castellani's private emails were made public, including one where Castellani wrote of Dorland,  "my mission in life is going to be to exact revenge on this pestilence of a person." GrubStreet director Eve Bridburg publicly expressed concern that Castellani's comments had "caused distrust and concern in our community." Castellani published an apology to the GrubStreet community, expressing regret for his words and saying, "I wrote some of those unprofessional emails as an admittedly hyperbolic, deliberatively provocative, and highly performative way of supporting my friend and fellow writer."

Awards 
 Massachusetts Book Award, 2004
 Guggenheim Fellowship, 2014
 Poets & Writers: Barnes & Noble Writers for Writers Award, 2015
 Massachusetts Cultural Council Fellowship, 2016

Writings

Novels 
A Kiss from Maddalena, Algonquin Books, 2003
The Saint of Lost Things, Algonquin Books, 2005
All This Talk of Love, Algonquin Books, 2013
Leading Men, Viking Books, 2019

Short fiction 
 "The Living," Ploughshares, 2013

Non-fiction 
The Art of Perspective: Who Tells the Story, Graywolf Press, 2016

Anthologies and essays 
 Now Write! Fiction Writing Exercises from Today's Best Writers and Teachers, Sherry Ellis, ed., Tarcher Books, 2006
 Naming the World: And Other Exercises for the Creative Writer, Bret Anthony Johnston, ed., Random House, 2008
 Mentors, Muses & Monsters, Elizabeth Benedict, ed., Excelsior Editions, 2012

References

External links 

Living people
1972 births
21st-century American novelists
Writers from Wilmington, Delaware
Novelists from Massachusetts
Swarthmore College alumni
Warren Wilson College faculty
American male novelists
21st-century American male writers
Boston University College of Arts and Sciences alumni
Tufts University School of Arts and Sciences alumni
Salesianum School alumni